Cosmic Trigger I: The Final Secret of The Illuminati is the first book in the Cosmic Trigger series, first published in 1977 and the first of a three-volume  autobiographical and philosophical work by Robert Anton Wilson. It has a foreword by Timothy Leary, which he wrote in the summer of 1977.

The first volume was published without numbering, as the second volume did not appear for nearly 15 years. 

Wilson is perhaps best known as the co-author of the award-winning science fiction work The Illuminatus! Trilogy. Cosmic Trigger revisits many of the themes from that earlier work in a more autobiographical fashion. After publishing the first volume of Cosmic Trigger, Wilson wrote two sequels, Cosmic Trigger II: Down to Earth (1991) and Cosmic Trigger III: My Life After Death (1995), the title of the first book retroactively changing to reflect the series.

Summary
Cosmic Trigger I deals with Wilson's experiences during a time in which he put himself through a process of "self-induced brain change" as well as vignettes of his earlier life. The main discovery of this process—which, he tells us, is known in certain traditions as Chapel perilous—is that "reality" (although a noun in most Indo-European language systems, and therefore commonly conceptualized as being a definite, unchanging "'thing") is mutable and subjective to the observer.

Wilson employs several models for his experiences, such as the interstellar ESP connection, during which time Wilson enters what he refers to as a 'reality tunnel', in which he claims to communicate telepathically with extraterrestrials residing in the Sirius star system. Wilson states however, that this belief system does not necessarily have any objective truth, which highlights his main point: that all such models—whether spiritual or scientific—are just that: models, or maps, of the world, and they should not be confused with an objective, permanent reality. Throughout the book, he makes references to specific paranormal personal and group experiences, yet he does not allow himself to become convinced of their reality apart from his perception of them. He calls this approach "model agnosticism".

The book also deals with the Bavarian Illuminati conspiracy (which Wilson neither rejects as utterly false nor embraces as true, in keeping with his theme) and other related intrigues. The work also touches on a wide range of other subjects, from Timothy Leary's thoughts on brain circuits and JFK's assassination, through to Sufism and numerous occult practises.

Publication history
Cosmic Trigger I was originally published by And/Or with Simon and Schuster in 1977 with an introduction by Timothy Leary. It was later republished by New Falcon Publications.

A new edition, edited and with a new introduction by John Higgs, was published by Hilaritas Press on February 23, 2016. Hilaritas Press is the new publishing house created by the Robert Anton Wilson Trust.

Stage adaptation

Cosmic Trigger has been adapted as a theatrical stage play by Daisy Eris Campbell, daughter of Ken Campbell the British theatre maverick who staged Illuminatus! at the Royal National Theatre in 1977. The new play opened on 23 November 2014 in Liverpool before transferring to London and Brighton. Some of the costs were met through crowdfunding. Wilson's book is itself dedicated to "Ken Campbell and the Science-Fiction Theatre of Liverpool, England."

The play's script was published in 2021 by Hilaritas Press as a paperback and ebook, under the title of Cosmic Trigger the Play. Along with the play-text, the book features an introduction by Ben Graham as well as colour photographs from the stage show.

The trilogy
 Cosmic Trigger I: The Final Secret of the Illuminati
Cosmic Trigger II: Down to Earth
Cosmic Trigger III: My Life After Death

References

External links
Excerpt from Cosmic Trigger I
Cosmic Trigger Play website
The Order Of Things Website

1977 books
Discordianism
American autobiographies
Occult books
Books by Robert Anton Wilson
Works about the Illuminati